Şıxlar (also Shykhlar and Shykhlyar) is a village in the Jabrayil Rayon of Azerbaijan.

Architecture 

Shikh Baba Mausoleum

References 

Populated places in Jabrayil District